Taras Rad (born 20 November 1999) is a Ukrainian amputated male cross-country skier and biathlete. He made his Paralympic debut at the age of 18 for Ukraine at the 2018 Winter Paralympics competing in Cross-country skiing and Biathlon events. He also went onto claim his first Paralympic medal during the 2018 Winter Paralympics after clinching the gold medal in the men's 12.5km sitting biathlon event.

Career 
Taras Rad sustained a leg injury at the age of 14 but was not treated properly by the doctors after receiving the treatment. He was later forced to amputate his leg in order to survive. Taras Rad took the sport of Paralympic Nordic skiing at the age of 14.

He won the bronze medal in the men's 6kilometres sitting biathlon event at the 2021 World Para Snow Sports Championships held in Lillehammer, Norway. He also won the silver medal in the men's 10kilometres sitting biathlon event.

In biathlon, he won the silver medal in the men's 6 kilometres sitting event and the bronze medal in the men's 10 kilometres sitting event at the 2022 Winter Paralympics held in Beijing, China.

References

External links 

 

1999 births
Living people
Ukrainian male biathletes
Ukrainian male cross-country skiers
Cross-country skiers at the 2018 Winter Paralympics
Biathletes at the 2018 Winter Paralympics
Biathletes at the 2022 Winter Paralympics
Paralympic biathletes of Ukraine
Paralympic cross-country skiers of Ukraine
Paralympic gold medalists for Ukraine
Paralympic silver medalists for Ukraine
Paralympic bronze medalists for Ukraine
Medalists at the 2018 Winter Paralympics
Medalists at the 2022 Winter Paralympics
Ukrainian amputees
Paralympic medalists in biathlon
Cross-country skiers at the 2022 Winter Paralympics
20th-century Ukrainian people
21st-century Ukrainian people